Johann Pistorius (14 February 1546 – 19 June 1608), also anglicized as John Pistorius or distinguished as Johann Pistorius the Younger, was a German controversialist and historian. He is sometimes called Niddanus from the name of his birthplace, Nidda in Hesse.

Life
His father was a well-known Protestant minister, Johann Pistorius the Elder (died 1583 at Nidda). From 1541 he was superintendent or chief minister of Nidda, and took part in several religious disputations between Catholics and Protestants.

Pistorius the Younger studied theology, law, and medicine at Marburg and Wittenberg 1559-67. He received the degree of Doctor of Medicine, and in 1575 was appointed court physician to the Margrave Karl II of Baden-Durlach, who frequently sought his advice in political and theological matters. Pistorius turned from Lutheranism to Calvinism; through his influence the Margrave Ernst Friedrich of Baden-Durlach made the same change.

As time went on, however, Pistorius became dissatisfied with Calvinism also. In 1584 he became a privy councillor of Margrave James III of Baden-Hochberg at Emmendingen; after further investigation he entered the Catholic Church in 1588. At his request the Margrave James brought about the religious disputations of Baden, 1589, and Emmendingen, 1590. After the second disputation the court preacher Johannes Zehender and the margrave himself became Catholics. James III, however, died on 17 August 1590, and being succeeded by his Protestant brother Ernst Friedrich, Pistorius was obliged to leave.

He went to Freiburg, became a priest in 1591, then vicar-general of Constance until 1594; after this he was an imperial councillor, cathedral provost of Breslau, Apostolic prothonotary, and in 1601 confessor to the Emperor Rudolph II. After his death his library came into the possession of the Jesuits of Molsheim and later was transferred to the theological seminary at Strasburg.

He died in Freiburg.

Works
Pistorius published a detailed account of the conversion of Margrave James III: "Jakobs Marggrafen zu Baden ... christliche, erhebliche und wolfundirte Motifen" (Cologne, 1591). His numerous writings against Protestantism, while evincing clearness, skill, and thorough knowledge of his opponents, especially of Luther, are marked by controversial sharpness and coarseness.

The most important are: "Anatomia Lutheri" (Cologne, 1595-8);"Hochwichtige Merkzeichen des alten und neuen Glaubens" (Münster, 1599); "Wegweiser vor alle verführte Christen" (Münster, 1599). Pistorius was attacked violently by the Protestants; e. g., by Samuel Huber, Cyriakus Spangenberg, Balthasar Mentzer, Horstius, and Christoph Agricola. Replies to the "Anatomia Lutheri" were written by the Protestant theologians of Wittenberg and Hesse.

Pistorius also busied himself with cabalistic studies, and published "Artis cabbalisticæ, h. e. reconditæ theologiæ et philosophiæ scriptorum tomus unus" (Basle, 1587). As court historiographer to the Margrave of Baden, he investigated the genealogy of the princely House of Zähringen; he also issued two works on historical sources: "Polonicæ historiæ corpus, i. e. Polonicarum rerum latini veteres et recentiores scriptores quotquot exstant" (Basle, 1582), and "Rerum Germanicarum veteres jam primum publicati scriptores aliquot insignes medii ævi ad Carolum V" (Frankfort, 1583–1607).

References
Günther, Hans-Jürgen, Die Reformation und ihre Kinder - dargestellt an Vater u. Sohn Johannes Pistorius Niddanus. Eine Doppel-Biographie, Nidda 1994
Günther, Hans-Jürgen,  Der Humanist Johannes Pistorius – Gründer des „Gymnasium Illustre“ zu Durlach, Markgrafen-Gymnasium Karlsruhe Durlach, Jahresbericht 1993/94, Durlach 1994.
Günther, Hans-Jürgen, Dr. Johannes Pistorius (1546–1608) Ein Arzt, Humanist und Theologe prägt badische Geschichte, in: AQUAE, Arbeitskreis für Stadtgeschichte Baden- Baden, Baden-Baden 1995.
Günther, Hans-Jürgen, "J. P. Niddanus d. J.", in: Lebensbilder aus Baden- Württemberg, Bd. 19, Stuttgart 1998, S. 109–145.
Günther, Hans-Jürgen, "Pistorius", in: Lexikon für Theologie und Kirche, Bd. 8, Freiburg 1999, S. 319 f.
Günther, Hans-Jürgen, "Pistorius, 1. Johannes d. Ä., 2. Johannes d. J.", in: Neue Deutsche Biographie (NDB), Bd. 22, Berlin 2001, S. 486 f.
Günther, Hans-Jürgen, J. Pistorius Niddanus, Vater und Sohn – Zwei Niddaer Persönlichkeiten im Jahrhundert von Reformation und katholischer Reform: Artikel in „NIDDA – Die Geschichte einer Stadt und ihres Umlandes“, Nidda 2003, S. 123–134.
Günther, Hans-Jürgen/Schlaefli, Louis: Bibliothekographie der Bücher aus der ehemaligen Bibliothek des Johannes Pistorius, die im Grand Séminaire zu Strasbourg zu finden sind. A: Katalog n. d. Straßburger Bibliotheksordnung, 31 S.,  B: Katalog nach Autoren, 35 S.,  C: Katalog nach Erscheinungsjahren der Bücher, 36 S., Emmendingen 1995.
Günther, Hans-Jürgen, "Emmendingen im Reformationsjahrhundert", in (Hrsg.:Jenne Hans-Jörg, Auer Gerhard A.) Geschichte der Stadt Emmendingen, Band I, Emmendingen 2006, S. 131-278
Räss, Die Convertiten seit der Reformation (Freiburg, 1866), II, 488-507; III, 91 sqq.
Gass, in Allgem. deut. Biog., XXVI, 199-201
Hugo von Hurter, Nomenclator, III (Innsbruck, 1907)
Janssen, Hist. of the German People at the close of the Middle Ages, X (tr. Christie, London, 1906), 116-48
Schmidlin, Johann Pistorius als Propst im Elsass in Hist. Jahrbuch, XXIX (1908), 790-804
Zell, Markgraf Jakob III. von Baden in Hist-pol. Blätter, XXXVIII (1856)
Von Weech, "Zur Gesch. des Markgrafen Jacob III. von Baden und Hachberg", in Zeitsch. für Gesch. des Oberrheins, new series, VII (1892), 656-700; VIII (1893), 710; XII (1897), 266-72.

External links
 
 http://www.latein-pagina.de/iexplorer/pistoriusvita.htm, From the website of Latin pagina.de by Hans-Juergen Guenther (a list of all fonts contain Pistorius)
 http://gso.gbv.de/DB=1.28/REL?PPN=004318404&RELTYPE=TT&COOKIE=U999,K999,D1.28,E1e9159cf-66,I0,B9994++++++,SY,A%5C9008+1,,0,H12-23,,30-31,,50,,60-61,,73-77,,80,,88-90,NGAST,R187.13.220.22,FN, in VD 17

1546 births
1608 deaths
People from Nidda
German Roman Catholics
16th-century German physicians
Converts to Roman Catholicism from Calvinism
German male non-fiction writers
16th-century German historians
16th-century German male writers